Katalin Csöbör (born 20 January 1965) is a Hungarian politician, member of the National Assembly (MP) for Miskolc (Borsod-Abaúj-Zemplén County Constituency I) since 2010. She was Deputy Mayor of Alsózsolca between 2010 and 2014.

She was a member of the Committee on Human Rights, Minority, Civic and Religious Affairs from 14 May 2010 to 5 May 2014, the Committee on Foreign Affairs from 6 May 2014 to 7 May 2018, and European Affairs Committee since 6 May 2014.

Personal life
She is married to György Mike. They have two sons, Pál and Martin.

References

1965 births
Living people
Fidesz politicians
Members of the National Assembly of Hungary (2010–2014)
Members of the National Assembly of Hungary (2014–2018)
Members of the National Assembly of Hungary (2018–2022)
Members of the National Assembly of Hungary (2022–2026)
Women members of the National Assembly of Hungary
People from Miskolc
21st-century Hungarian women politicians